M. G. Sasi (born 17 January 1964) is a film and drama director from Kerala. His short film Kanavumalayilekku received National Film Award for Best Educational Film in 2002. His first feature film Atayalangal (2008) received the Kerala State Film Awards for Best Film and Best Direction in 2007.

Feature films

Director
Adayalangal (2007)
Janaki (2010), released in 2018
 Abimanini (film) (2019)

Actor
Films
Sadayam (1992)
Venalkkinavukal (1992)
Guru (1997)
Mangamma (1997)... Velayudhan
Kaliyattam (1997)
Sneham (1998)
Susanna (2000)
Santham (2000)
Ritu (2009)... Hari Varma
Oru Indian Pranayakadha (2013)... Dr.Sunil Kumar
Pithavum Kanyakayum (2013)... Balachandran
Aatakadha (2013)... Parameshwaran
Njangalude Veettile Athidhikal (2014)
Ennum Eppozhum (2015)
Utopiayile Rajavu (2015)... Advocate
Jalam (2016)
Njan Prakashan... Doctor
Short films
A Knife In The Bar (2012)
ICU (2013)

TV serials
2016 - Nilavum Nakshtrangalum (Amrita TV)

References

External links

Living people
Malayalam film directors
People from Palakkad district
Indian documentary filmmakers
1967 births
Film directors from Kerala
21st-century Indian film directors
20th-century Indian male actors
21st-century Indian male actors
Male actors in Malayalam cinema
Indian male film actors
Male actors from Kerala